Edrisah Kenzo Musuuza, known professionally as Eddy Kenzo, is a Grammy-nominated Ugandan singer and music executive who is a founder and a member of Big Talent Entertainment. He received international attention after the release of his 2014 single, "Sitya Loss" and an accompanying viral video that featured the Ghetto Kids. In total, he has released 4 albums, including Roots in 2018 and most recently Made in Africa in 2021. Kenzo has also won numerous national and international awards, including a Nickelodeon Kids' Choice Award in 2018, a BET Award in 2015, and multiple All Africa Music Awards.

In 2022, Kenzo was nominated for a Grammy Award for Best Global Performance, for Gimme Love, (Matt B featuring Kenzo).  The song's U.S. Afrobeats Billboard chart peak was in November 2022, when it hit number 36. Matt B and Kenzo performed, Gimme Love at the Eddy Kenzo Festival at Kololo Airstrip in Uganda to an audience of over 20,000, including Uganda's Prime Minister Robinah Nabbanja. Kenzo was the first Ugandan artiste to win the BET Award in 2015 and the first Ugandan artist to be nominated for a Grammy award.

Early life and education

Eddy Kenzo whose real name is Edrisah Musuuza was born in Masaka, Uganda. His mother died when he was 4 or 5 years old, and he spent the following 13 years living largely on the streets of Masaka and Kampala. Initially, Kenzo aspired to be a professional footballer and joined Masaka Local Council FC's camp at age 9. He would later receive a sports bursary to attend Lubiri Secondary School in Kampala, but he never finished his studies.

Career
Kenzo began making music using his stage name, Eddy Kenzo, in 2008. That year, he released his first song titled "Yannimba" with Mikie Wine. In 2010, he released another single, "Stamina". The song was used as a theme song by many politicians during the 2011 Ugandan general election At the Pearl of Africa Music Awards in 2011, Kenzo was given the Best New Artist award. Kenzo also established his Big Talent Entertainment record label early on in his career. He continues to serve as a member of that venture.

Kenzo continued releasing new music in 2012. In 2013, he held his first concert at the Kyadondo Rugby Club that year in support of the track, "Kamunguluze". Kenzo's first major international breakthrough came with 2014's "Sitya Loss" and the accompanying album of the same name. A YouTube video featuring a group of Ugandan children known as the Ghetto Kids dancing to the song went viral after it was shared on social media by record executive Sean Combs in September 2014. As of March 2022 the video has accumulated nearly 42 million views on YouTube. Kenzo also started a petition to earn the children an appearance on The Ellen DeGeneres Show. After the release of "Sitya Loss" and the album of the same name, Kenzo went on a brief United States tour with dancehall musician, DeMarco.

In January 2015, Kenzo performed at the opening ceremonies of that year's Africa Cup of Nations in Equatorial Guinea alongside Akon. He also performed at the tournament final. Around that time, he produced a remix to his 2014 single, "Jambole", with a guest appearance from Nigerian singer, Kcee. In June 2015, Kenzo was honored with the BET Award for "Viewer's Choice Best New International Artist". He was the first East African artist to win a BET Award of any kind. In July 2015, he performed at the KigaliUp Music Festival in Rwanda's capital. In October of that year, he released a remixed version of his song, "Mbilo Mbilo", featuring Nigerian singer, Niniola. The original version of that song later appeared on the soundtrack for the 2016 film, Queen of Katwe.

In December 2015, Kenzo released the lead single, "Soraye", off of his second album, Zero to Hero. In March 2016, he went on a tour Africa, with stops in Kenya, Ivory Coast, Mali, and others. Later that month, he released Zero to Hero. Throughout the remainder of 2016, Kenzo earned a writing credit on Jidenna's "Little Bit More", was featured on the Mi Casa single "Movie Star", and won an All Africa Music Award for his "Mbilo Mbilo" remix. He also went on another US tour late in the year. In May 2017, Kenzo was named the ambassador of the Kenyan Tourism Board and was appointed to a similar role in Uganda the following year.

In July 2017, Kenzo went on a European tour ahead of the release of his third studio album, Biology, a month later. The album featured guest appearances from artists like Mani Martin, Werrason, and Mi Casa, among others. It also featured the single "Jubilation", which had an accompanying music video that won the Best East African Music Video Award at the Zanzibar International Film Festival. He would go on to win two awards at that year's All Africa Music Awards, including Best East African Male Artist. He would later donate that award along with his 2015 BET Award to the Uganda Museum in Kampala.

In March 2018, Kenzo won a Nickelodeon Kids' Choice Award as the "Favorite African Star." In July 2018, he performed alongside Triplets Ghetto Kids at multiple African music festivals in Canada, including Afrofest in Toronto. He also performed at the One Africa Music Festival in Dubai later in the year. In October 2018, he released his fourth studio album, Roots, which featured the single "Body Language". Kenzo also announced a 10-year anniversary concert in celebration of his time as a musical artist. The concert took place on 4 January 2019 in the Victoria ballroom of the Serena Hotel in Kampala. Leading up to the concert, Kenzo released a new music video for a song from Roots each week for two months.

In March 2019, it was announced that Kenzo would be featured alongside Triplets Ghetto Kids in an upcoming music video for American singer Chris Brown's "Back to Love". In April 2019, Kenzo released the single, "Signal" with an accompanying music video.

On a hot streak Eddy Kenzo followed up with the 2021 studio album "Made in Africa" featuring some of the hottest producers including Hunter Nation from Tanzania for the hit love song "SoulMate". The album went on to do amazing numbers with fans and supporters grateful for the new music.

In 2022, Kenzo collaborated with US musician Matt B on Gimme Love. The song entered the Billboard US Afrobeats Songs at #49 in October and Peaked at #36 in November that year. He and Matt B received a nomination for the song for Grammy Award for Best Global Music Performance at the 65th Annual Grammy Awards. The nomination made Kenzo the first Ugandan musician working and living in Uganda to receive the first ever Grammy nomination.

Philanthropy
In 2015, Kenzo launched a charitable organization called the Eddy Kenzo Foundation. In January 2016, he enlisted Ugandan footballers, Tony Mawejje and Vincent Kayizzi, to help donate goods to nursing mothers and staff at the local Masaka hospital. In July 2017, he hosted two charity football matches in Masaka and Kampala that featured Victor Wanyama. The event raised funds for Ugandan children with HIV. In March 2019, he opened the Big Talent Soccer Academy in Kampala. The academy identifies local youth talent and provides education to help foster their skills.

Personal life
Kenzo began a romantic relationship with Ugandan recording artist Rema Namakula. On 26 December 2014, Rema Namakula and Eddy Kenzo had a daughter at Paragon Hospital, in the Kampala neighborhood of Bugoloobi. Kenzo, who has another daughter (Maya Musuuza) from a previous relationship, acknowledged he was the father and named the newborn Amaal Musuuza.
Kenzo and Rema separated in mid 2019 and Rema immediately got engaged to her former doctor Dr.Hamza Ssebunya.

Discography

Studio albums

Singles

Awards and nominations

References

External links
Official website

1989 births
Living people
Ugandan musicians
People from Masaka District
Afrobeat musicians
Dancehall musicians